There have been 83 royal yachts of the monarchy of the United Kingdom since the restoration of the monarchy in 1660.

Charles II had 25 royal yachts, while five were simultaneously in service in 1831.

Merchantmen or warships have occasionally been chartered or assigned for special duty as a temporary royal yacht, for example the steamship Ophir in 1901 and the battleship HMS Vanguard in 1947.

Since 1998, following a successful national tender process, Britannia has been berthed permanently at the Port of Leith in Edinburgh. There are currently no British royal yachts, although MV Hebridean Princess and MY Leander G have both been used by the royal family.

Kingdom of England
Data about launch years from Royal Yachts of the World (1997) by Tim Madge
 Mary (1660–1675)
 Royal Escape (dates unknown)
 Anne (1661–unknown)
 Bezan (1661–unknown)
 Katherine (first ship of that name) (1661–unknown) – Built by Phineas Pett
 Minion (dates unknown)
 Charles (first ship of that name) (1662–unknown)
 Jamie or Jemmy (1662–unknown)
 Henrietta (first ship of that name) (1663–unknown)
 Merlin* (1666–unknown)
 Monmouth (1666–unknown)
 Navy (1666–unknown)
 Saudadoes (1670–unknown)
 Cleveland (1671–unknown)
 Queenborough (first ship of that name) (1671–unknown)
 Deale (1673–unknown)
 Isle of Wight (1673–unknown)
 Kitchen (1670–unknown)
 Katherine  (second ship of that name) (1674–unknown)
 Portsmouth (first ship of that name) (1674–unknown)
 Charles (second ship of that name) (1675–unknown)
 Charlot (1677–unknown)
 Mary (second ship of that name) (1677–unknown)
 Henrietta (second ship of that name) (1679–unknown)
 Izabella Bezan (1680–unknown)
 Fubbs (1682–unknown)
 Isabella (first ship of that name) (1680–unknown)
 William & Mary (first ship of that name) (1694–unknown)
 Squirrel (1694–unknown)
 Scout (1695–unknown)
 Queenborough (second ship of that name) (1701–unknown)
 Soesdyke (1702–unknown)
 Portsmouth (second ship of that name) (1702–unknown)
 Isabella (1703–unknown)
 Drake (1705–unknown)

Kingdom of Great Britain
 Dublin (1709–unknown)
 Bolton (1709–unknown)
 Charlot (1710–unknown)
 Carolina (1710–unknown)
 Chatham  (1710–unknown)
 Chatham  (1741–unknown)
 Portsmouth (1742–unknown)
 Royal Caroline (renamed Royal Charlotte in 1761) (1749–1820)
 Dorset (1753–unknown)
 Plymouth (1755–unknown)
 Augusta (1771–unknown)
 Portsmouth (1794–unknown)
 Plymouth (1796–unknown)

United Kingdom
 Royal Sovereign (1804–1849)
 William & Mary (1807–unknown)
 Royal George (1817–1842)
 Prince Regent (1820–unknown)
 Royal Charlotte (1824–1832)
 Royal Adelaide (1834–1878)
 Victoria and Albert (1843–1855) - Remained in service as Osborne (1855–1867)
 Fairy (1845–1863) (tender to Victoria and Albert)
 Elfin (1848–1901)
 Victoria and Albert (ii) (1855–1900)
 Alberta (1863–1913) (tender to Victoria and Albert (ii))
 Osborne (1870–1908) (tender to Victoria and Albert (ii))
 Victoria and Albert (iii) (1901–1937)
 SS Ophir* (1901) – Chartered steamship for the royal tour of the colonies
 Alexandra (1908–1925)
 RMS Medina (1911–1912) – Chartered P&O steamship for the royal visit to India
 Britannia (royal cutter yacht) (1893–1936)
 RMS Empress of Britain (1931–1940)
 RMS Empress of Australia (1939)
  – Used in 1920 for the Prince of Wales Empire tour and in 1927 by the Duke and Duchess of York to visit Australia
 HMS Vanguard (1947) – Battleship used to take George VI and family to South Africa
 Gothic (1952–1954) 
 Britannia (1954–1997)

Potential new yacht
In 2021 the UK government announced plans for a new 'ship of state' to be managed jointly between the Ministry of Defence, Foreign, Commonwealth and Development Office and Department for International Trade. The plan for the ship is to "host trade fairs, ministerial summits and diplomatic talks", fulfilling functions in a similar capacity to previous Royal Yachts. The ship would be crewed by the Royal Navy. The cost was placed at between £200m and £250m. Some reports suggested the yacht would be named after the late Duke of Edinburgh. By late 2022 some reports suggest that the UK government may not proceed with the new yacht.

See also
 Royal Yacht Squadron
 Royal barge of the United Kingdom
 Royal Mews
 State and royal cars of the United Kingdom
 Air transport of the Royal Family and government of the United Kingdom
 British Royal Train
 List of imperial and royal yachts by country

References

Sources

Further reading

External links
 Royal Marines Bands 
 New York Times archive The end of the Royal Tour of 1901
 New York Times archive Ordering the new yacht in 1897
 Hampshire and Dorset shipwrecks Collision of HMY Albee with the Mistletoe
 New York Times archive Review of the Fleet 1897
 The Royal Yacht Britannia, Leith, Edinburgh. Visitor attraction and evening events venue.
 The list of Navy vessels for December 1695 (House of Commons Journal)
 The £1.4-million yacht Hebridian Princess This yacht was chartered by the Queen for her 80th Birthday. Formerly the MacBrayne ferry Columba built in 1964; converted to a miniature cruise ship for just 49 passengers in 1989.
 The £50-million Motor Yacht Leander Chartered by Prince of Wales for visit to Caribbean in March 2008. Chartered yacht instead of jet was to demonstrate his concern for the environment.

 
Royal Yacht
Yachts